The 15th Pan-American Games were held in Rio de Janeiro, Brazil, between 13 July 2007 and 29 July 2007. The Brazilian delegation consisted of 659 athletes (373 men and 286 women) and 267 directors, making a total of 926 people in 41 sports. Competing in their own country, the Brazilian athletes managed to far surpass their own record number of Gold, Silver and Bronze medals obtained in a single edition of the Pan-American Games.

Goals
The Rio de Janeiro Mayor and Brazilian Olympic Group wanted to show that Brazil is capable to receive the 2014 World Cup, for which is the only candidate so far, and that the city is eligible to host the 2016 Summer Olympics.

Another mission of Brazil was to achieve the 2nd position among the top History Pan-American Winners.

The COB also used the competition to prepare itself for the 2008 Summer Olympics.

Medalists
The following competitors from Brazil won medals at the games. In the by discipline sections below, medalists' names are bolded.

Results by event

Aquatics

Diving
Female
Evelyn Winkler
Juliana Veloso
Milena Canto Sae
Tammy Galera Takagi

Male
Cassius Duran
César Castro
Hugo Parisi
Ubirajara Barbosa

Open water swimming 
4 athletes (2 female and 2 male)

Female
Poliana Okimoto
Ana Marcela Cunha

Male
Allan do Carmo
Marcelo Romanello

Swimming
52 athletes (25 female and 26 male)

Female
Daiene Dias
Fabíola Molina
Fernanda Alvarenga
Flávia Delaroli
Gabriella Silva
Joanna Maranhão
Larissa Cieslak
Lilian Cerroni
Manuella Lyrio
Mariana Katsuno
Michelle Lenhardt
Monique Ferreira
Nayara Ribeiro
Paula Baracho
Poliana Okimoto
Tatiana Barbosa
Tatiane Sakemi
Veruska Clednev

Male
Armando Negreiros
César Cielo
Diogo Yabe
Eduardo Deboni
Felipe May Araújo
Felipe Lima
Fernando Silva
Gabriel Mangabeira
Henrique Barbosa
Kaio de Almeida
Leonardo Guedes
Lucas Salatta
Luiz Arapiraca
Nicolas Oliveira
Nicholas Santos
Rodrigo Castro
Thiago Pereira

Synchronised swimming
9 female athletes
Beatriz Feres
Branca Feres
Caroline Hildebrant
Giovana Stephan
Glaucia Souza
Lara Teixeira
Michelle Frota
Nayara Figueira
Pamela Nogueira

Water polo
26 athletes (13 female, 13 male)

Female
Ana Vasconcelos
Andréa Henriques
Amanda Oliveira
Camila Pedrosa
Ciça Canetti
Fernanda Lissoni
Flávia Fernandes
Luíza Carvalho
Maria Barbara Amaro
Marina Canetti
Manuela Canetti
Melina Teno
Tess Oliveira

Male
André Cordeiro
André Raposo
Bruno Nolasco
Daniel Mameri
Erik Seegerer
Felipe Franco
Gabriel Reis
Leandro Ruiz Machado
Lucas Vita
Luís Santos
Roberto Seabra
Rodrigo dos Santos
Vicente Henriques

Archery
6 athletes (3 female and 3 male)

Women
Sarah Nikitin
Fátima Rocha
Petra Ruocco

Men
Marcos Bortoloto
Leonardo Carvalho
Fabio Emilio

Athletics
83 athletes (39 female and 44 male)

Female
Márcia Narloch (Running)
Sirlene Pinho (Running)

Male
Franck de Almeida (Running)
Vanderlei Cordeiro de Lima (Running)
Mário José dos Santos Júnior (Athletic 50 km)
Cláudio Richardson dos Santos (Athletic 50 km)

Badminton
8 athletes (4 female and 4 male)

Female
Fabiana Silva (singles)
Mariana Arimori (singles)
Paula Beatriz Pereira (doubles)
Thayse Cruz (doubles)

Male
Guilherme Pardo (singles and doubles)
Guilherme Kumasaka (doubles)
Lucas Araújo (singles and doubles)
Paulo Scala (simples and doubles)

Baseball
20 male athletes

Pitchers
Marcelo Kaneo Arai (Dourados / Dourados – MS)
Rodrigo Watanabe Miyamoto (Yamaha – JAP)
Fernando Oda (Coopercotia / São Paulo – SP)
Gustavo Yukio Ogassawara (Nittadai University – JAP)
Kléber Ojima (Mogi das Cruzes / Mogi das Cruzes – SP)
Gilmar Henrique Pereira (Philadelphia Phillies – USA)
Marcio Sakane (Dragons / Itapecerica da Serra – SP)
Claudio Kenji Yamada (Atibaia / Atibaia – SP)

Catchers
Rafael Motooka de Oliveira (Guarulhos / Guarulhos – SP)
Ricardo Hideki Shimanoe (São Paulo / São Paulo – SP)

Infielders
Marcelo Okuyama (São Paulo / São Paulo – SP)
Ronaldo Hidemi Ono (Nippon Blue Jays / Arujá – SP)
Reinaldo Tsuguio Sato (Yamaha – JAP)
Renan Issamu Sato (Mitsubishi – JAP)
Evaldo Yamaoka (Dragons / Itapecerica da Serra – SP)

Outfielders
Tiago Campos de Magalhães (Yamaha – JAP)
Celso Takashi Nakano (São Paulo / São Paulo – SP)
Paulo Roberto Orlando (Chicago White Sox – USA)
Anderson Gomes dos Santos (Chicago White Sox – USA)
Julio Shinji Takahashi (Nippon Blue Jays / Arujá – SP)

Basketball

Men's team competition
Team Roster
Marcelo Machado
Welington dos Santos
Murilo da Rosa
Marcus Reis
Marcelo Huertas
Valter Silva
Alex García
Guilherme Teichmann
Caio Torres
João Paulo Batista
Marcus Vinicius
Paulo Prestes
Head coach: Aluisio Ferrerira

Women's team competition
Team Roster
Janeth Arcain
Graziane Coelho
Tatiana Conceição
Jucimara Dantas ("Mamá")
Patricia Ferreira ("Chuca")
Micaela Jacinto
Palmira Marçal
Isis Nascimento
Adriana Moisés Pinto
Karen Rocha
Kelly Santos
Soeli Zakrzeski ("Êga")

Bowling
4 athletes (2 female and 2 male)

Female
Jacqueline Costa
Roseli Santos

Male
Fabio Rezende
Rodrigo Hermes

Boxing
11 male athletes

To 48 kg: Paulo Carvalho
To 51 kg: Robenilson Vieira
To 54 kg: James Dean Pereira
to 57 kg: Davi Souza
To 60 kg: Éverton Lopes
To 64 kg: Myke Carvalho
To 69 kg: Pedro Lima
To 75 kg: Glaucelio Abreu
To 81 kg: Washington Silva
To 91 kg: Rafael Lima
Over 91 kg: Rogério Nogueira

Canoeing
14 athletes (5 female and 9 male)
Female
Bruna Gama (K1 e K4)
Naiane Pereira (K2 e K4)
Ariela Pinto (K2 e K4)
Daniela Alvarez (K4)
Mayara Cardoso (reserve)

Male
Sebástian Cuattrin (K4 1000m e K2 1000m)
Guto Campos (K4 1000m e K2 500m)
Roberto Mahler (K4 1000m e K2 500m)
Edson Isaías da Silva (K4 1000m e K1 500m)
Jonathan Maia (K2 1000m)
Givago Ribeiro (K2 1000m)
Nivalter Santos de Jesus (C1 1000m e C1 500m)
Vladimir Moreno (C2 1000m e C2 500m)
Vilson Conceição (C2 1000m e C2 500m)

Cycling
23 athletes (6 female and 17 male)

Male
Marcos Novello (road and track)
Marcos Vinícius Correia de Alcântra (track)
Davi Romeo (track)
Fernando Firmino (track)
Magno Nazaret (track)
Roberson Figueiredo (track)
Hernandes Cuadri (track)
Rodrigo Brito (track)

BMX
Female
Ana Flavia Sgobin
Luciana Hirama

Male
Hudson Peixoto
Mauro Aquino

Mountain bike
Female
Jaqueline Mourão

Male
Edivando Cruz
Ricardo Pscheidt

Road
Female
Clemilda Fernandes
Uênia Fernandes
Janildes Fernandes

Male
Luciano Pagliarini
Rafael Andriato
Renato Seabra
Otavio Bulgarelli
Pedro Nicacio
Marcos Novello (also competed in track cycling)

Track
Male
Marcos Novello (also competed in road cycling)
Marcos Vinícius Correia de Alcântra
Davi Romeo
Fernando Firmino
Magno Nazaret
Roberson Figueiredo
Hernandes Cuadri
Rodrigo Brito

Equestrian

Dressage
Rider / Horse
Rogerio Clementino / Nilo Vo
Renata Costa / Monty
Luiza Almeida / Samba

Eventing
Rider / Horse
Fabricio Salgado / Butterfly
Carlos Paro / Political Mandate
Renan Guerreiro / Rodizio AA
Andre Paro / Land Heir
Saulo Tristao / Totsie
Serguei Fofanoff /  Ekus TW

Show jumping
Rider / Horse
Bernardo Alves / Chupa Chup 2
Pedro Veniss / Un Blancs De Blanc
Cesar Almeida / Singular Joter II
Rodrigo Pessoa / Rufus
Pia Aragão
Renata Rabello
Jorge Rocha (dressage)

Show Jumping
5 athletes
Bernardo Alves
Rodrigo Pessoa
César Almeida

Fencing
16 athletes (8 female and 8 male)

Female
Camila Rodrigues
Clarisse Menezes

Male
Athos Schwantes
Heitor Shimbo
Ivan Schwantes
João Souza
Marcos Cardoso
Rhaoni Ruckheim
Renzo Agresta

Field hockey
32 athletes (16 female and 16 mas)

Football
36 athletes (18 female and 18 male)

Male
Marcelo – Flamengo
Renan – Atlético Mineiro
Átila – Corinthians
Michel – Figueirense
Foster – Internacional
Lucas – Flamengo
Rafael – Fluminense
Fábio – Fluminense
Bruno – Grêmio
Fellipe – Botafogo
Bernardo – Cruzeiro
Tales – Internacional
Lulinha – Corinthians
Tiago – Grêmio
Carlos – Vasco
Júnior – Botafogo
Maicon – Fluminense
Alex – Vasco

Futsal
12 athletes

Gymnastics

Trampoline
3 athletes (2 female and 1 male)

Female
Giovanna Venetiglio Matheus

Handball
30 athletes (15 female and 15 male)

Judo
14 athletes (7 female and 7 male)

Female
Ligeiros (Up to 48 kg): Daniela Polzin
Meio-leves (to 52 kg): Érika Miranda
Leves (to 57 kg): Danielle Zangrando
Meio-médios (to 63 kg): Daniele Yuri
Médios (to 70 kg): Mayra Aguiar
Meio-pesados (to 78 kg): Edinanci Silva
Pesados (More than 78 kg): Priscila Marques

Male
Ligeiros (to 60 kg): Alexandre Lee
Meio-leves (to 66 kg): João Derly
Leves (to 73 kg): Leandro Guilheiro
Meio-médios (to 81 kg): Flávio Canto
Médios (to 90 kg): Tiago Camilo
Meio-pesados (to 100 kg): Luciano Corrêa
Pesados (more than 100 kg): João Gabriel Schilliter

Karate
9 athletes (3 female and 6 male)
Female
Dafani Figueiredo (To 60 kg)
Lucélia Peres de Carvalho (More de 60 kg)
Valéria Kumizaki (To 53 kg)

Male
Caio Duprat (até 75 kg)
Carlos Lourenço (até 65 kg)
Douglas Brose (até 60 kg)
Juarez Santos (acima 80 kg)
Nelson Sardenberg (até 80 kg)
Vinicius Souza (até 70 kg)

Modern pentathlon
Four athletes (two female and two male)
Wagner Romão
Daniel Santos
Yane Marques
Larissa Lellys

Roller skating

Rowing
33 athletes (11 female and 22 male)
Alexandre Fernandes Ribas (TBD)
Alexandre Monteiro Dias Fernandes Fernandez (oito com)
Alexis Árias Mestre (TBD)
Allan Scaravaglioni Bittencourt (dois sem e oito com)
Amanda da Costa Duarte (dois sem)
Anderson Nocetti (dois sem e oito com)
Camila de Carvalho e Carvalho (skiff duplo peso leve)
Caroline Farré Beloni (dois sem)
Célio Dias Amorim (TBD)
Deborah Amorim (skiff duplo peso leve)
Fabiana Beltrame (skiff quádruplo)
Gibran Vieira da Cunha (quatro sem e oito com)
Gustavo Villela dos Santos (TBD)
Henrique Vieira Motta (TBD)
Jairo Natanael Fröhlich Klug (TBD)
João Hildebrando Borges Jr. (TBD)
João Roberto Lopes Pallassão (TBD)
João Soares Jr. (TBD)
José Carlos Gonçalves Sobral Jr. (skiff duplo peso leve)
José Roberto do Nascimento Jr. (TBD)
José Rodrigo Rangel (TBD)
Kissya Cataldo da Costa (skiff quádruplo)
Leandro Francisco Tozzo (quatro sem e oito com)
Leandro Loureiro Franco Ferreira (quatro sem peso leve)
Luciana Granato (skiff duplo peso leve)
Marcelus Marcili dos Santos Silva (TBD)
Marco Moreira Martins (TBD)
Mônica Anversa Fuchs (skiff quádruplo)
Nilton Silva Alonço (oito com)
Renan Koplewski de Castro (TBD)
Renata Görgen (skiff quádruplo)
Ronaldo da Gama Vargas (TBD)
Thiago Almeida (TBD)
Thiago Gomes (double skiff peso leve)

Sailing
16 athletes (2 female and 14 male)
Female
Adriana Kostiw
Patrícia Castro

Male
Alexandre Paradeda
Alexandre Saldanha
Bernardo Arndt
Bernardo Low-Beer
Bruno Oliveira
Cláudio Biekarck
Daniel Santiago
Gunnar Ficker
João Carlos Jordão
Marcelo Silva
Maurício Santa Cruz
Pedro Tinoco
Ricardo Winicki
Robert Scheidt

Shooting
29 athletes (11 female and 18 male)
Aliseu Farias (air carbine and carbine 3x40)
Ana Luiza Mello (sport pistol)
Cecília Frej (air pistol)
Cristina Badaró (carabina de ar)
Daniela Carraro (skeet)
Emerson Duarte (tiro rápido)
Fábio Coelho (air carbine and carbine 3x40)
Fernando Cardoso Jr. (tiro rápido)
Filipe Fuzaro (fossa doublé)
Janice Teixeira (fossa olimpic)
Júlio Almeida (air pistol)
Luiz Bork (carbine deitado)
Luiz Carlos Graça (fossa doublé)
Rachel da Silveira (sport pistol)
Renata Castro (air pistol)
Renato Araújo Portela (skeet)
Roberto Schmits (fossa olimpic)
Rodrigo Bastos (fossa olimpic)
Samuel Leandro Lopes (carbine deitado)
Simone Cezar da Rocha (air carbine and carbine 3x20)
Stenio Yamamoto (pistol livre and air pistol)
Vladimir da Silveira (pistol livre)
Wilson Zocolote (skeet)

Softball
Cinthia Kudo
Elayne Simon
Nilze Higa
Mirian Yuki Someya

Receptor
Márcia Mizushima
Vivian Morimoto

Defense''
Tathiane Misawa
Simone Miyahira
Kátia Ayumi Abe
Martha Murazawa
Camila Ariki
Juliana Shibata
Simone Suetsugu
Mariana Sayuri Abe
Patrícia Sugino
Maria Eliza Tanaka
Cynthia Takahashi

Squash
6 athletes (3 female and 3 male)

Luciano Barbosa
Rafael Alarçón
Ronivaldo Conceição
Karen Redfern
Mariana Pontalti
Thaisa Serafini

Table tennis
8 athletes (4 female and 4 male)FemaleLígia Silva
Mariany Nonaka
Karin Sako
Carina Murashige (reserve)MaleHugo Hoyama
Thiago Monteiro
Gustavo Tsuboi
Cazuo Matsumoto (reserve)

Taekwondo
8 athletes (4 female and 4 male)

Natália Falavigna (Heavyweight – +67 kg)
Valdirene Gonçalves (Flyweight – 49 kg)
Debora Nunes Lightweight – 57 kg)
Érica Ferreira Middleweight – 67 kg)
Diogo Silva (Lightweight – 68 kg)
Márcio Wenceslau (Flyweight – 58 kg)
Carlos Isidoro (Middleweight – 80 kg)
Leonardo Gomes (Heavyweight – +80 kg)

Tennis
8 athletes (4 female and 4 male)
Jenifer Widjaja
Teliana Pereira

Triathlon

Men's competition
Juraci Moreira
 1:52:54.79 – Bronze MedalVirgílio de Castilho
 1:55:17.24 – 13th place
Antônio Marcos da Silva
 2:06:50.94 – 29th place

Women's competition
Mariana Ohata
 2:00:51.28 – 5th place
Carla Moreno
 2:02:03.29 – 9th place
Sandra Soldan
 2:06:35.99 – 19th place

Volleyball
24 athletes (12 female and 12 male)

Beach volleyball
4 athletes (2 female and 2 male)

Female
Larissa
Juliana

Male
Ricardo
Emanuel

Water skiing
Juliana Negrão
Felipe Neves
Fernando NevesWakeboard Masculino'''
Marcelo Giardi
Mário Manzolli

Weightlifting

Wrestling
11 athletes (4 female and 7 male)
Adrian Jaoude (−84 kg, estilo livre)
Antoine Jaoude (−96 kg, estilo livre)
Caroline De Lazzer (−63 kg, estilo livre)
Diego Rodrigues (−120 kg, estilo livre)
Fábio Cunha (−55 kg, estilo grego-romano)
Felipe Macedo (−74 kg, estilo grego-romano)
Iuri Cunha (−60 kg, estilo livre)
Joice Silva (−55 kg, estilo livre)
Luis Fernandes (−96 kg, estilo grego-romano)
Marcelo Gomes "Zulu" (−84 kg, estilo grego-romano)
Raoni Barcelos (−66 kg, estilo livre)
Renato Migliaccio (−66 kg estilo greco-romano)
Renato Roma (−70 kg, estilo livre)
Rodrigo Artilheiro (−120 kg, estilo grego-romano)
Rosangela Conceição (−72 kg, estilo livre)
Suzana Almeida (−48 kg, estilo livre)
Vinicius Pedrosa (−55 kg, estilo livre)
Waldeci Silva (−60 kg, estilo livre)

References

External links
 Official website of the Brazilian Olympic Committee

Nations at the 2007 Pan American Games
Pan American
2007